The Ōpaekaa Road Bridge is a steel truss bridge listed on the National Register of Historic Places located along Ōpaekaa Road in the Wailua Homesteads neighborhood of Kapaa, on the island of Kauai, in the state of Hawaii, United States. The one-lane bridge spans Ōpaekaa Stream. With steel beams forged in 1890 by the Alexander Findlay & Company in Motherwell, Scotland, this is touted as possibly the only British-built bridge located in the United States.

History
The steel supports for this bridge were originally forged in 1890 and utilized as part of the Wailua River Bridge. Constructed as a three span, steel truss bridge, its construction was delayed through 1894 due to the overthrow of the Hawaiian Kingdom and the establishment of the Republic of Hawaii. When this span was replaced in 1919, the steel was reused in the construction of the present-day bridge over Opaekaa Stream. Its relocation was carried out by then County Engineer Joseph Moragne.

Having an average daily traffic of 382 vehicles as of 1986, the bridge is maintained by the Kauai County Division of Roads. With a sufficiency rating of only 14.7 percent and substandard safety railing, this span is listed as structurally deficient and past the point of rehabilitation, necessitating the need for a replacement span for the crossing.

As a result of its age and exposure, many of its steel beams are rusted through, with much of its concrete deck cracked in multiple locations. Due to its deteriorating state its rated load was reduced to 5 tons in 2007, then to 3 tons, and is listed to be replaced as part of the Hawaii Department of Transportation's current statewide transportation improvement program.

References

Bridges completed in 1894
Truss bridges in the United States
Road bridges on the National Register of Historic Places in Hawaii
Transportation in Kauai County, Hawaii
Buildings and structures in Kauai County, Hawaii
National Register of Historic Places in Kauai County, Hawaii
Steel bridges in the United States